Stryker's reagent ([(PPh3)CuH]6), also known as the Osborn complex, is a hexameric copper hydride ligated with triphenylphosphine.  It is a brick red,  air-sensitive solid. Stryker's reagent is a mildly hydridic reagent, used in homogeneous catalysis of conjugate reduction reactions of enones, enoates, and related substrates.

Preparation and structure
The compound is prepared by hydrogenation of copper(I) tert-butoxide, generated in situ from copper(I) chloride and sodium tert-butoxide. Other more convenient methods have been developed since its discovery.

In terms of its structure, the compound is an octahedral cluster of Cu(PPh3) centres that are bonded by Cu---Cu and Cu---H interactions.  Originally six of the eight faces were thought to be capped by hydride ligands.  This structural assignment was revised in 2014; the hydrides are now best described as edge bridging rather than face bridging.

Applications in organic synthesis
The compound can effect regioselective conjugate reductions of various carbonyl derivatives including unsaturated aldehydes, ketones, and esters. This reagent was assigned as the "Reagent of the year" in 1991 for its functional group tolerance, high overall efficiency, and mild reaction conditions in the reduction reactions. Stryker's reagent is used in a catalytic amount where it is regenerated in the reaction in situ using a stoichiometric hydride source, often being molecular hydrogen or silanes. If stored under an inert atmosphere (e.g. argon, nitrogen) it has indefinite shelf life. Brief exposure to the oxygen does not destroy its activity significantly, although solvents used with Stryker's reagent should be rigorously degassed.

Modifications to Stryker's reagent
Ligand-modified versions of Stryker's reagent have been reported. By changing the ligand to e.g. P(O-iPr)3 the selectivity can be improved significantly. In addition, Lipshutz et al., have shown that the addition of a bidentate, achiral bis-phosphine ligand on the Cu center can lead to substrate-to-ligand ratios typically on the order of 1000−10000:1 can be used to afford products in high yields.

References

Copper complexes
Triphenylphosphine complexes
Metal hydrides
Reducing agents